The 44th Directors Guild of America Awards, honoring the outstanding directorial achievements in films, documentary and television in 1991, were presented on March 14, 1992 at the Beverly Hilton and the United Nations. The ceremony in Beverly Hills was hosted by Carl Reiner and the ceremony in New York was hosted by Mario Van Peebles. The feature film nominees were announced on January 28, 1992, commercial nominees were announced in February, and nominees in six television categories were announced on March 1, 1992.

Winners and nominees

Film

Television

Commercials

D.W. Griffith Award
 Akira Kurosawa

Lifetime Achievement in Sports Direction
 Edward T. Nathanson

Robert B. Aldrich Service Award
 Jack Shea

Franklin J. Schaffner Achievement Award
 Marilyn Jacobs-Furey

Honorary Life Member
 Charles Champlin

References

External links
 

Directors Guild of America Awards
1991 film awards
1991 television awards
Direct
Direct
Directors
1992 in Los Angeles
1992 in New York City
March 1992 events in the United States